Nucu River may refer to:

 Nucu River (Bălăneasa)
 Nucu River (Slănic)

See also 
 Nucu
 Nucet River (disambiguation)